Agriculture Insurance Company of India Limited (AIC) is an Indian central public sector undertaking under the ownership of Ministry of Finance, Government of India. It is a government-owned-agricultural insurer headquartered in New Delhi. It is under the ownership of Government of India and administrative control of the Ministry of Finance of India. It offers yield-based and weather-based crop insurance programs in almost 500 districts of India. It covers almost 20 million farmers, making it the biggest crop insurer in the world in number of farmers served.

AIC aims to provide insurance coverage and financial support to the farmers in the failure of any of the notified crop as a result of natural calamities, pests and diseases to restore their creditworthiness for the ensuing season; to encourage the farmers to adopt progressive farming practices, high value in-puts and higher technology; to help stabilize farm incomes, particularly in disaster years. The plan provides comprehensive risk insurance for yield losses due to natural fire and lightning, storms, hailstorms, cyclone, typhoon, tempest, hurricane, tornado flood, inundation, landslide, drought, dry spells, pests/diseases, etc.

Incorporation
AIC was incorporated on 20 December 2002 with an authorized capital of Rs. 1500 crore. The initial paid-up capital was Rs. 200 crores, which was subscribed by the promoting companies, General Insurance Corporation of India GIC (35%), NABARD (30%) and the four public-sector general insurance companies (8.75%) each, viz., National Insurance Co. Ltd., Oriental Insurance Co. Ltd., New India Assurance Co. Ltd., and United India Insurance Co. Ltd.

AIC is under the administrative control of Ministry of Finance, Government of India, and under the operational supervision of Ministry of Agriculture, Government of India. Insurance Regulatory and Development Authority (IRDA), Hyderabad, India, is the regulatory body governing AIC.

Commencement of business
AIC commenced its business operations from 1 April 2003 by taking over the implementation of the "National Agricultural Insurance Scheme" (NAIS) from GIC. AIC has been designated by the Govt., of India as the "Implementing Agency" of NAIS, its country-wide crop insurance program.

Offices and products

AIC has 18 regional offices in state capitals across India. AIC sells agriculture and allied insurance products and schemes. A significant amount of business is derived out of the yield-based "National Agriculture Insurance Scheme (NAIS)", "National Crop Insurance Programme (NCIP)" and the "Weather Based Crop Insurance Scheme (WBCIS)". Some other products of AIC, developed in-house, are:

Rainfall Insurance Scheme for Coffee (RISC) 
Coffee Rainfall insurance is a unique rainfall insurance product designed in consultation with Coffee Board, Central Coffee Research Institute and coffee growers of the states of Karnataka, Kerala and Tamil Nadu. The rainfall insurance provides effective risk management aid to those coffee growers likely to be impacted by adverse rainfall incidence. Agriculture Insurance Company of India Ltd. compensates the insured against the likelihood of diminished coffee output/yield resulting from shortfall / excess in the actual rainfall (as the case may be) for different coverage options. The insurance operates during 1 March to 31 August.

Bio-fuel Tree/Plant Insurance Policy 
Named-peril insurance covering six different species of plants/trees, available for commercial production of Bio-diesel, with optional cover against drought risk.

Cardamom Plant & Yield Insurance 
The scheme is designed in consultation with Spices board to provide conventional cover against death/loss of plant bushes. Cover available for small and large cardamom varieties.

Potato Crop Insurance 
Parametric named-peril insurance linked to plant population, available for potato growers under contract farming.

PulpWood Tree Insurance Policy 
The policy covers against pecuniary loss suffered on account of total loss or damage to the trees occasioned by specific perils/risks like fire, flood, cyclone, storm, frost, pests and diseases.

RainFall Insurance Scheme For Coffee (RISC) 
Failure of Blossom shovers, Backing showers and Excess rainfall during monsoon and post monsoon seasons affect the crop yield. Scheme offers cover and is implement in all coffee growing zones of Andhra pradesh, Assam, Karnataka, Kerala, Mizoram, Odisha and Tamil Nadu with subsidy support from Government.

Rubber Plantation Insurance 
Covers death/loss of rubber trees against natural calamities and other non preventable perils, applicable to both mature and immature plants, based on establishment cost and loss of future returns.

Varsha Bima / RainFall Insurance 
Covers anticipated shortfall in crop yield on account of deficit and excess rainfall, consecutive dry and wet days, etc. It is voluntary for all classes of cultivators who stand to lose financially upon adverse incidence of rainfall and they can take insurance under the scheme. It is available for many of the seasonal field crops.

Coconut Palm Insurance Scheme 
Named peril insurance designed in consultation with Coconut Development Board (CDB), covering coconut palms in the age groups of 4–15 years and 16–60 years, against death due to Fire, Lightning, Cyclone, Storm, Flood, Pests, and Widespread diseases, Earthquake, Severe Drought, etc. The pilot is available in specified districts of Andhra Pradesh, Goa, Karnataka, Kerala, Maharashtra, Odisha and Tamil Nadu. CDB would provide 50% subsidy on premium, and the concerned State to the extent of 25%, leaving the grower to pay the balance 25%.

Weather Insurance (RABI) 
It is a mechanism for providing effective risk management aid to those individuals and institutions likely to be impacted by adverse weather incidents. The most important benefits of Weather index insurance are,

 Trigger events like adverse weather events can be independently verified and measured.
 It allows for speedy settlement of indemnities, as early as fortnight after indemnity period.
 All growers, may it be Small/Marginal, Owners or Tenants/Sharecroppers can buy this weather insurance.

See also
 Agricultural insurance in India

References

External links 
 

 http://financialservices.gov.in/insurance-divisions/Public-Sector-Insurance-Companies

Financial services companies established in 2002
Insurance companies of India
Agriculture companies of India
Companies based in New Delhi
Agricultural insurance in India
Public sector in India
Government-owned companies of India
India government-related lists